The 2010–11 Irish Cup (known as the JJB Sports Irish Cup for sponsorship reasons) was the cup's 131st edition since its introduction and the 89th time that the trophy was presented to the winners of the annual knock-out competition in Northern Ireland. The competition began on 18 September 2010 with the First Round and ended on 7 May 2011 with the Final.

Linfield were the champions, winning their fifth Irish Cup in the last six seasons, by defeating Crusaders 2–1 in the final, who were appearing in their second final in the last three seasons.
Crusaders qualified for the second qualifying round of the 2011–12 UEFA Europa League because Linfield had already qualified for the Champions League via the league.

Results

First round
The draw for the first round was held on 28 August 2010. Matches were scheduled to be played on 18 September 2010.

|}

Second round
The draw for the second round was held on 24 September 2010.  Games were played on Saturday 23 October 2010.

|}

Third round
Matches were played on 20 November 2010 and 27 November 2010.

|}

Fourth round
The fourth round draw took place on 25 November 2010. All 30 clubs from IFA Championship 1 and 2 entered the competition at this stage. As well as the 10 intermediate clubs that had progressed through the previous rounds. Matches were played on 11 December 2010 and two re-arranged ties were played on 15 January 2011.

|}

Fifth round
The fifth round draw took place on 15 December 2010. All 12 clubs from the IFA Premiership entered the competition at this stage, as well as the 20 winners of the previous round of matches. Matches were played on 15 January 2011. Replays were played on 25 January 2011.

|-
|colspan="3" style="background:#E8FFD8;"|Replays

|}

Sixth round
The sixth round draw took place on 15 January 2011. Matches were played on 12 February 2011. During the draw ball 16 was mistakenly named as number 10, leaving confusion when 10 was read out a second time.

|-
|colspan="3" style="background:#E8FFD8;"|Replays

|}

Quarter-finals
The Quarter-finals were played on 5 March 2011. The replays were played on 14 March 2011.

|-
|colspan="3" style="background:#E8FFD8;"|Replays

|}

Semi-finals
The Semi-finals were played on 9 April 2011.

Final

References

External links
 Official site
 nifootball.co.uk

2010–11
Cup
2010–11 domestic association football cups